Heinrich Michael Neustetter (14 June 1874 , Vienna- 13 February 1958 Offenhausen ) was an Austrian entomologist who specialised in Lepidoptera.
He was an  insect specimen dealer. His collection is held by Naturhistorisches Museum, Vienna.

Works
Africa
Neustetter, H. 1912 Neue oder wenig bekannte Cymothoe Arten. Deutsche Entomologische Zeitschrift, Iris 26:167-185.   
Neustetter, H. 1916 Neue und wenig bekannte afrikanische Rhopaloceren. Deutsche Entomologische Zeitschrift, Iris 30:95-108.   
Neustetter, H. 1921 Besprechung wenig bekannter afrikanischer Nymphalidae. Zeitschrift des Osterreichischen Entomologen-Vereins, Wien 6:27, 34, 41-42, 47-48.   
Neustetter, H. Verzeichnis der von Herrn Rudolf Oldenburg in Kamerun gesammelten Schmetterlinge. Zeitschrift des Osterreichischen Entomologen-Vereins, Wien 11:106-108.   
Neustetter,, H. (1927a): Neue afrikanische Tagfalter. Internationale Entomologische Zeitschrift 21:7-8, 14-16, 23-24, 32.   
Neustetter, H. 1927 Verzeichnis de von Herrn Rudolf Oldenburg in Kamerun versammelten Schmetterlinge. Zeitschrift des Osterreichischen Entomologen-Vereins, Wien 12:60-62.   
Neustetter,, H. 1928 Eine neue afrikanische Nymphalide. Internationale Entomologische Zeitschrift 21:445-446.   
Neustetter,, H. 1929 Neue exotische Tagfalter. Internationale Entomologische Zeitschrift 22:389-392.   
Neustetter,, H. Eine neue Catopsilia von Madagascar. Internationale Entomologische Zeitschrift 23:336-337.   
Neustetter,, H. 1929c) Eine neue afrikanische Pieriden-Gattung. Internationale Entomologische Zeitschrift 23:191-192.

References
Anonym 1958: [Neustetter, H. M.] Ent. Nachrichtenbl. Berlin 5 (3)	
Anonym 1958: [Neustetter, H. M.] Zeitschrift der Wiener Entomologischen Gesellschaft, Wien 43 (69), 64	
Nonveiller, G. 1999: The Pioneers of the research on the Insects of Dalmatia. Zagreb, Hrvatski Pridodoslovni Muzej, 1-390.

Austrian lepidopterists
1958 deaths
1874 births
Austro-Hungarian scientists